Søren Rasmussen may refer to:
Søren Egge Rasmussen (born 1961), Danish politician and MF
Søren P. Rasmussen (born 1967), Danish politician and former mayor
Søren Rasmussen (born 1972), Danish politician and member of Kolding City Council
Sørenn Rasmussen (born 1976), Danish handballer